Friars Hill is an unincorporated community in Greenbrier County, West Virginia, United States.

The community was named after one Mr. Friar, a pioneer who settled upon a hill.

References

Unincorporated communities in Greenbrier County, West Virginia
Unincorporated communities in West Virginia